The grammar of the Sanskrit language has a complex verbal system, rich nominal declension, and extensive use of compound nouns. It was studied and codified by Sanskrit grammarians from the later Vedic period (roughly 8th century BCE), culminating in the Pāṇinian grammar of the 4th century BCE.

Grammatical tradition

Origins
Sanskrit grammatical tradition (vyākaraṇa, one of the six Vedanga disciplines) began in late Vedic India and culminated in the Aṣṭādhyāyī of Pāṇini.

The oldest attested form of the Proto-Indo-Aryan language as it had evolved in the Indian subcontinent after its introduction with the arrival of the Indo-Aryans is called Vedic. By 1000 BCE, the end of the early Vedic period, a large body of Vedic hymns had been consolidated into the Ṛg·Veda, which formed the canonical basis of the Vedic religion, and was transmitted from generation to generation entirely orally.

In the course of the following centuries, as the popular speech evolved, there was rising concern among the guardians of the Vedic religion that the hymns be passed on without 'corruption', which for them was vital to ensure the religious efficacy of the hymns. This led to the rise of a vigorous, sophisticated grammatical tradition involving the study of linguistic analysis, in particular phonetics alongside grammar, the high point of which was Pāṇini's stated work, which eclipsed all others before him.

Pāṇini
Pāṇini's Aṣṭādhyāyī, a prescriptive and generative grammar with algebraic rules governing every single aspect of the language, in an era when oral composition and transmission was the norm, is staunchly embedded in that oral tradition. In order to ensure wide dissemination, Pāṇini is said to have preferred brevity over clarity – it can be recited end-to-end in two hours. This has led to the emergence of a great number of commentaries of his work over the centuries, which for the most part adhere to the foundations laid by Pāṇini's work.

After Pāṇini
About a century after Pāṇini, Kātyāyana composed vārtikas (explanations) on the Pāṇinian sũtras. Patañjali, who lived three centuries after Pāṇini, wrote the Mahābhāṣya, the "Great Commentary" on the Aṣṭādhyāyī and Vārtikas. Because of these three ancient Sanskrit grammarians this grammar is called Trimuni Vyākarana.

Jayaditya and Vāmana wrote a commentary named Kāśikā in 600 CE. 's (12th century AD) commentary on Patañjali's  also exerted much influence on the development of grammar, but more influential was the Rupāvatāra of Buddhist scholar Dharmakīrti which popularised simplified versions of Sanskrit grammar.

Bhaṭṭoji's disciple Varadarāja wrote three abridged versions of the original text, named Madhya-Siddhānta-Kaumudī, Sāra-Siddhānta-Kaumudī and Laghu-Siddhānta-Kaumudī, of which the latter is the most popular. Vāsudeva Dīkṣita wrote a commentary named Bālamanoramā on Siddhānta-Kaumudī.

European grammatical scholarship began in the 18th century with Jean François Pons and others, and culminated in the exhaustive expositions by 19th century scholars such as Otto von Böhtlingk, William Dwight Whitney, Jacob Wackernagel and others.

Timeline
The following is a timeline of notable post-Pāṇinian grammatical figures and approximate dates:

 Kātyāyana – 300 BCE
 Patañjali – 150 BCE
 Bhartṛhari – V CE
 Kāśikā – VII
 Śākaṭāyana – IX
 Kaiyaṭa – XI
 Hemacandra – XII
 Śaraṇadeva – XII
 Vopadeva – XIII
 Bhattoji-dīkṣita – XVII

Phonology

The sound system 

The Sanskrit alphabet, or sound system, can be represented in a 2-dimensional matrix arranged on the basis of the articulatory criteria:

Pronunciation examples 

The table below shows the traditional listing of the Sanskrit consonants with the nearest equivalents in English (as pronounced in General American and Received Pronunciation or wherever relevant in Indian English), French, Spanish, Russian or Polish, along with approximate IPA values.

(Further information: IPA chart (vowels and consonants) – 2015. and IPA pulmonic consonant chart with audio )

It should be understood that, while the script commonly associated with Sanskrit is Devanagari, this has no particular importance. It just happens currently to be the most popular script for Sanskrit. The form of the symbols used to write Sanskrit has varied widely geographically and over time, and notably includes modern Indian scripts. What is important is that the adherence to the phonological classification of the symbols elucidated here has remained constant in Sanskrit since classical times. It should be further noted that the phonology of modern Indian languages has evolved, and the values given to Devanagari symbols in modern Indo-Aryan languages, e.g., Hindi, differ somewhat from those of Sanskrit.

Sound classes

Vowels 

The long syllabic l (ḹ) is not attested, and is only discussed by grammarians for systematic reasons. Its short counterpart ḷ occurs in a single root only, kḷp . Long syllabic r (ṝ) is also quite marginal, occurring (optionally) in the genitive plural of ṛ-stems (e.g. mātṛ, pitṛ ⇒ mātṝṇām, pitṝṇām).

i, u, ṛ, ḷ are vocalic allophones of consonantal y, v, r, l. There are thus only 5 invariably vocalic phonemes: a, ā, ī, ū, ṝ.

Visarga and anusvāra

Visarga ḥ  is an allophone of r and s, and anusvara ṃ, Devanagari  of any nasal, both in pausa (i.e., the nasalised vowel).

Sibilants

The exact pronunciation of the three sibilants may vary, but they are distinct phonemes. Voiced sibilants, such as z , ẓ , and ź  as well as its aspirated counterpart źh , were inherited by Proto-Indo-Aryan from Proto-Indo-Iranian but lost around or after the time of the Rigveda, as evidenced due to ḷh (an aspirated retroflex lateral consonant) being metrically a cluster (that was most likely of the form ẓḍh; aspirated fricatives are exceedingly rare in any language).

Retroflex consonants

The retroflex consonants are somewhat marginal phonemes, often being conditioned by their phonetic environment; they do not continue a PIE series and are often ascribed by some linguists to the substratal influence of Dravidian or other substrate languages.

Nasals

Phonologically independent /ŋ/ occurs only marginally, e.g. in prāṅ 'directed forwards/towards' [nom. sg. masc. of an adjective].

Sandhi

The phonological rules which are applied when combining morphemes to a word, and when combining words to a sentence, are collectively called sandhi "composition". Texts are written phonetically, with sandhi applied (except for the so-called padapāṭha).

Phonological processes 
A number of phonological processes have been described in detail. It is the incomplete articulation, or ""repressing or obscuring", of a plosive or, according to some texts, a semi-vowel (except r), which occurs before another plosive or a pause. These texts are not unanimous on the environments that trigger abhinidhana, nor on the precise classes of consonants affected.

One ancient grammarian,  (in  6.12), states that  only occurred when a consonant was doubled, whereas according to the text of the  it was obligatory in this context but optional for plosives before another plosive of a different place of articulation. The  and the  agree on the observation that abhinidhana occurs only if there is a slight pause between the two consonants and not if they are pronounced jointly. The latter text adds that final semivowels (excluding r) are also incompletely articulated. The  2.38 lists an exception: a plosive at the end of the word will not undergo  and will be fully released if it is followed by a consonant whose place of articulation is further back in the mouth.

Morphophonology

Vowel gradation

Sanskrit inherits from Proto-Indo-European the feature of regular in-word, vowel variations known in the context of the parent language as ablaut or more generally apophony.

This feature, which can be seen in the English forms sing, sang, sung, and song, themselves a direct continuation of the PIE ablaut, is fundamental in Sanskrit both for inflexion and derivation.

Vowels within stems may change to other related vowels on the basis of the morphological operation being performed on it. There are three such grades, named the zero grade, first grade, and second grade. The first and second grades are also termed guṇa and vṛddhi respectively. The full pattern of gradation,  followed by example usage:

As per the internal and historical structure of the system, the guṇa grade can be seen as the normal grade, whence proceeds either a strengthening to form the second grade, or a weakening to form the zero-grade. The ancient grammarians however took the zero-grade as the natural form on which to apply guṇa or vṛddhi.

Whilst with the 1-grade-based system it is possible to derive the 0-grades thus:

 ghóṣ·a·ti ⇒ ghuṣ·ṭá-
 sráv·a·ti ⇒ sru·tá-
 sváp·a·ti ⇒ sup·tá-

the approach used by the ancient grammarians does not always work:

 sup·tá- ≠ *sóp·a·ti

To overcome this, the ancient grammarians, while formulating most roots in zero-grade form, make an exception for some, and prescribe a treatment called samprasāraṇa on these:

 ghóṣ·a·ti, ghuṣ·ṭá- ⇒ ghuṣ-
 sráv·a·ti, sru·tá- ⇒ sru-
 sváp·a·ti, sup·tá- ⇒ svap-

Thus, unlike most others, the root 'svap-' does not hold a 0-grade vowel, and is subject to samprasāraṇa before the past participle 'sup·tá-' can be formed.

Besides *r̥, *l̥, Proto-Indo-European also had *m̥, *n̥, all of which, in capacity of zero-grade vowels, participated in the gradation system. Whilst the latter two did not survive in Sanskrit (they ended up as a instead), their effects can be seen in verb-formation steps such as just seen above.

Therefore, it is possible to analogically expand the above vowel-gradation table thus:

The proto-forms of ga·tá- and ha·tá- would thus have *m̥  and *n̥ respectively:  *gʷm̥·tó- and *gʷʰn̥·tó-

Accent
Sanskrit inherited a pitch accent (see: Vedic accent) from Proto-Indo-European, as well as vowel gradation, both of which, in Sanskrit, just as in the parent language, go hand in hand. 

As a general rule, a root bearing the accent takes the first (guṇa) or second (vṛddhi) grade, and when unaccented, reduces to zero grade.

 i- ⇒ éti (0 ⇒ 1st grade)
 i·tá ⇒ áy·anam (0 ⇒ 2nd grade)

The gradation examples given in the previous sections demonstrate several more instances of this phenomenon with verbs. 

With nouns, the pattern does not always hold, as even from the earliest stage of the language, there has been a tendency to fix a single form, thus while kṣam has kṣā́mas (2-g) and kṣmás (0-g), vāc has 2nd-grade forms throughout. 

Nouns whose stem vary between strong, middle and weak forms may correspondingly reflect 2nd, 1st and zero-grade vowels respectively. This may not always be matched by the accent:

 rā́jan, rā́jānam, rā́jnā (1, 2, 0 grades)

The above system of accent disappeared completely at some point during the classical stage. It was still alive in Pāṇini's time and even after Patañjali. The author of the Kāśikā commentary declares its use optional, and it might have disappeared from popular speech in the early centuries of the Common Era.

Verbs

Background
Sanskrit has inherited from its parent the Proto-Indo-European language an elaborate system of verbal morphology, more of which has been preserved in Sanskrit as a whole than in other kindred languages such as Ancient Greek or Latin.

Some of the features of the verbal system, however, have been lost in the classical language, compared to the older Vedic Sanskrit, and in other cases, distinctions that have existed between different tenses have been blurred in the later language. Classical Sanskrit thus does not have the subjunctive or the injunctive mood, has dropped a variety of infinitive forms, and the distinctions in meaning between the imperfect, perfect and aorist forms are barely maintained and ultimately lost.

Conjugation

Verb conjugation in Sanskrit involves the interplay of five 'dimensions', number, person, voice, mood and tense, with the following variables:

Further, participles are considered part of the verbal systems although they are not verbs themselves. Classical Sanskrit has only one infinitive, of accusative case-form.

Formation

The starting point for the morphological analysis of the Sanskrit verb is the root. Before the final endings to denote number, person etc can be applied, additional elements may be added to the root. Whether such elements are affixed or not, the resulting component here is the stem, to which these final endings can then be added.

Based on the treatment they undergo to form the stem, the roots of the Sanskrit language are arranged by the ancient grammarians in ten classes , based on how they form the present stem, and named after a verb typical to each class.

No discoverable grammatical principle has been found for the ordering of these classes. This can be rearranged for greater clarity into non-thematic and thematic groups as summarized below:

Scope

As in kindred Indo-European languages, conjugation is effected across the tenses, moods, voices, persons and numbers stated, yielding, in Sanskrit, a huge number of combinations.

Furthermore, Sanskrit has so-called Secondary conjugations:

 Passive
 Intensive
 Desiderative
 Causative
 Denominative

The non-finite forms are:

 Participles 
 Infinitive
 Gerund

Nominals

Declension

Declension of a noun in Sanskrit involves the interplay of two 'dimensions': 3 numbers and 8 cases. Further, nouns themselves in Sanskrit, like its parent Proto-Indo-European, can be in one of three genders.

In addition, adjectives behave much the same way morphologically as nouns do, and can conveniently be considered together. While the same noun cannot be seen to be of more than one gender, adjectives change gender on the basis of the noun they are being applied to, along with case and number, thus giving the following variables:

The oldest system of declension was in Proto-Indo-European, inherited by Sanskrit, to affix the endings directly to the nominal root. In later stages, a new system developed wherein an intermediary called the thematic vowel is inserted to the root before the final endings are appended: *-o- which in Sanskrit becomes -a-, producing the thematic stem.

Stem classification

Substantives may be divided into different classes on the basis of the stem vowel before they are declined on the above basis. The general classification is:

 a-stems
 i- and u-stems
 ā-, ī- and ū-stems
 ṛ-stems
 Consonant stems

When the nominal endings are being affixed to a noun of each class, they may undergo, in some cases, some changes, including being entirely replaced by other forms.

Numerals

Personal pronouns and determiners

Sanskrit pronouns and determiners behave in their declension largely like other declinable classes such as nouns, adjectives and numerals, so that they can all be classed together under nominals. However, pronouns and determiners display certain peculiarities of their own compared to the other nominal classes. 

Furthermore, personal pronouns have an additional dimension not present in the other nominals, but shared by verbs: person.

Pronouns are declined for case, number, and gender. The pronominal declension applies to a few adjectives as well. Many pronouns have alternative enclitic forms.

Derivation

Derivation or word-formation in Sanskrit can be divided into the following types:

 Primary derivation – suffixes directly appended to roots
 Secondary derivation – suffixes appended to derivative stems
 Word-compounding – combining one more word stems

Compounds

Sanskrit inherits from its parent Proto-Indo-European the capability of forming compound nouns, also widely seen in kindred languages such as especially German, Greek and also English. 

However, Sanskrit, especially in the later stages of the language, significantly expands on this both in terms of the number of elements making up a single compound and the volume of compound-usage in the literature, a development which has no parallels elsewhere.

Indeclinables

Words that change no form across cases, numbers, genders are classified as indeclinables.  Indeclinables may be divided into either simple and compound. The latter is treated under Sanskrit compounds and the term indeclinable usually implies only the former type.

Indeclinables can be classified as follows:

 Prepositions
 Adverbs
 Particles
 Conjunctions
 Interjections
 Miscellaneous

Prepositions

In Sanskrit, a preposition is an indeclinable with an independent meaning that is prefixed to verbs and their derivatives with the result of modifying, intensifying, or in some cases, totally altering the sense of the roots.

Adverbs

In Sanskrit, adverbs are either inherited as set forms from the parent language or may be derived from nouns, pronouns or numeral. 

The typical way of forming an adverb is to simply use the accusative singular neutral form of nouns and adjectives.

Particles

Particles are used either as expletives or intensives.

The most common ones are:

 a-, an- – generally the same meaning as English 'un-' and 'a-', but with some extended senses
 sma – when used with the present form of a verb, it conveys the past tense
 kā-, ku- – prefixed to give a negative, inadequate or pejorative connotation.

Conjunctions

The following is an enumeration of the main types of Sanskrit conjunctions:

 atha – marks the beginning of a work
 Copulative – atha, atho, uta, ca, etc
 Disjunctive – vā, vā... vā, etc
 Adversative  – athavā, tu, kintu, etc
 Conditional – cet, yadi, yadāpi, net, etc
 Causal – hi, tat, tena, etc
 Interrogative – āho, uta, utāho, kim, etc
 Affirmative and negative – atha kim, ām, addhā, etc
 Conjunctions of time – yāvat-tāvat, yadā-tadā, etc
 iti – marks the end of a work

Interjections

The main ones in Sanskrit expressing the various emotions are:

 Wonder, grief, regret, etc: ā, aho, ha, etc
 Contempt: kim, dhik,  etc
 Sorrow, dejection, grief: hā, hāhā, hanta, etc
 Joy: hanta  etc
 Respectfully calling attention: aho, bhoḥ, he, ho, etc
 Disrespectfully calling attention: are, rere,  etc

Miscellaneous

A few nouns have only one inflection and thus behave like indeclinables. The most common ones are:

Syntax 

Because of Sanskrit's complex declension system, the word order is free. In usage, there is a strong tendency toward subject–object–verb (SOV), which was the original system in place in Vedic prose. However, there are exceptions when word pairs cannot be transposed.

Notably, Pāṇini did not fix syntax in the Aṣtādhyāyī, as to do so explicitly would be difficult in any language, given several ways of expressing the same idea and various other ways of expressing similar ideas. Thus within the bounds of phonological and morphological definition wrought by Pāṇini, the syntax of Sanskrit has continued to evolve in the course of its productive literary history.

Peculiar characteristics 

In the introduction to his celebrated translation of Vidyakara's Subhāṣitaratnakośa, Daniel H.H. Ingalls describes some peculiar characteristics of the Sanskrit language. 

He refers to the enormous vocabulary of Sanskrit, and also of the presence of a larger choice of synonyms in Sanskrit than any other language he knew of. Further, just as there exist a vast number of synonyms for almost any word in Sanskrit, there also exist synonymous constructions. In his elementary Sanskrit examinations he would ask his students to write in Sanskrit the sentence 'You must fetch the horse' in ten different ways. Actually, it is possible to write the sentence in Sanskrit in around fifteen different ways 'by using active or passive constructions, imperative or optative, an auxiliary verb, or any of the three gerundive forms, each of which, by the way, gives a different metrical pattern'. 

He emphasizes that while these constructions differ formally, emotionally they are identical and completely interchangeable, that in any natural language this would be impossible. This and other arguments are used to show that Sanskrit is not a natural language, but an 'artificial' language. By 'artificial' is meant that it was learned after some other Indian language had been learned the natural way. 

Ingalls writes: 'Every Indian, one may suppose, grew up learning naturally the language of his mother and his playmates. Only after this, and if he belonged to the priesthood or the nobility or to such a professional caste as that of the clerks, the physicians, or the astrologers, would he learn Sanskrit. As a general rule, Sanskrit was not the language of the family. It furnished no subconscious symbols for the impressions which we receive in childhood nor for the emotions which form our character in early adolescence.'

See also
Sanskrit nominals
Sanskrit verbs
Sanskrit compound
Pāṇini
Aṣṭādhyāyī
Vedic Sanskrit grammar
Proto-Indo-Aryan
Proto-Indo-Iranian
Proto-Indo-European

Notes

Glossary

Traditional glossary and notes

References

Bibliography
  		
 
 
 
 
 
 
 
 Böhtlingk, Otto, Pâṇini's Grammatik, Leipzig (1887)
 
 B. Delbrück, Altindische Tempuslehre (1876)  Topics in Sanskrit morphology and syntax
  Staal, Frits, Word order in Sanskrit and Universal Grammar, Foundations of Language, supplementary series 5, Springer (1967), .
 

 Wackernagel, Debrunner, Altindische Grammatik, Göttingen.
 vol. I. phonology  Jacob Wackernagel (1896)
 vol. II.1. introduction to morphology, nominal composition, Wackernagel (1905) 
 vol. II.2. nominal suffixes, J. Wackernagel and Albert Debrunner (1954)
 vol. III. nominal inflection, numerals, pronouns, Wackernagel and Debrunner (1930)

External links 
 Vedic Society Sandhi Calculator
 Little Red Book PDF
 Sanskrit grammar Laghu-Siddanta-Kaumudi (English & Tamil Lectures)
 Sanskrit grammar Video AdiLaghu (English & Tamil)
 Charles Wikner "A Practical Sanskrit Introductory"
 Julia Papke "Order and Meaning in Sanskrit Preverbs"
 V. Swaminathan "Panini’s Understanding of Vedic Grammar"
  — sources results from Monier Williams etc.
  — dynamic online declension and conjugation tool
 
 
 

 
Indo-Aryan grammars
Indo-Iranian grammars
Indo-European grammars